Catalinas is a station on Line E of the Buenos Aires Underground. The station was opened on 3 June 2019 as part of the extension of the line from Bolívar to Retiro.

References

Buenos Aires Underground stations